This is a list of episodes of the Japanese anime Tokyo Underground. The anime premiered on the TV Tokyo television network on April 2, 2002 and ended on September 24, 2002, containing twenty-six episodes. It was animated by Studio Pierrot. The TV series was released on DVD by Geneon Entertainment in the US and Canada, released as a boxset by Manga Entertainment in the UK and by Tokyo Night Train in Australia. Cartoon Network Adult Swim it also aired in Canada on the digital channel G4techTV Canada, starting on July 22, 2007 at 8:30 pm ET/PT. English Airdates listed below are from the Canadian TV Broadcast.

Episode list

References

Tokyo Underground